The Russian First League 1993 was the 2nd edition of Russian First Division. There were 3 zones with 58 teams in total. The winner of each zone qualified for the promotion tournament to play against the teams that took places 14 to 16 in the 18-team Russian Top League 1993, 3 top teams from the tournament qualified for the Russian Top League 1994. For 1994 the Russian league system was reorganized, with First League reduced to one zone of 22 teams, so most of the 1993 Russian First League teams were relegated at the end of the season.

West

Overview

Standings

Top goalscorers 
25 goals
 Sergei Burdin (FC Chernomorets Novorossiysk)

24 goals
 Yuri Vostrukhin (FC Torpedo Taganrog)

22 goals
 Andrei Lapushkin (FC Smena-Saturn St. Petersburg)

21 goals
 Khazret Dyshekov (FC Chernomorets Novorossiysk)

19 goals
 Valeri Borisov (FC Kolos Krasnodar)
 Murat Gomleshko (FC Kuban Krasnodar)

18 goals
Lev Berezner (FC Chernomorets Novorossiysk)
Gennady Korkin (FC Metallurg Lipetsk)
Igor Tikhonov (FC Tekstilshchik Ivanovo)
Tamazi Yenik (FC Druzhba Maykop)

Center

Overview

Standings

Top goalscorers 
37 goals
 Vladimir Filimonov (FC Zvezda Perm)

36 goals
 Vladimir Kulik (FC Zenit St. Petersburg)

31 goals
 Sergei Chesnakas (FC Lada Togliatti)

29 goals
 Oleg Teryokhin (FC Sokol Saratov)

25 goals
 Oleg Smirnov (FC Shinnik Yaroslavl)

21 goals
 Andrei Ivanov (FC Gazovik Izhevsk)
 Aleksei Snigiryov (FC Interros Moscow)

20 goals
 Mikhail Nikitin (FC Sokol Saratov)

17 goals
 Igor Kozlov (FC Interros Moscow)

15 goals
 Yuri Bavykin (FC Lada Togliatti)
 Lev Matveyev (FC Zvezda Perm)

East

Overview

Standings

Top goalscorers 
22 goals
 Vyacheslav Kamoltsev (FC Dynamo-Gazovik Tyumen)

16 goals
 Andrey Dementyev (FC Kuzbass Kemerovo)

15 goals
 Vyacheslav Kartashov (FC Irtysh Omsk)
 Vladimir Vekvart (FC Lokomotiv Chita)

14 goals
 Oleg Razzamazov (FC Tom Tomsk)

13 goals
 Yevgeni Burdinskiy (FC Zarya Leninsk-Kuznetsky)

11 goals
  Karapet Mikaelyan (FC Zvezda-Yunis-Sib Irkutsk)

10 goals
 Vladislav Kadyrov (FC Sakhalin Kholmsk)
 Andrei Skovpen (FC Kuzbass Kemerovo)

9 goals
 Vadim Bazhenov (FC Zarya Leninsk-Kuznetsky)
 Sergei Chernov (FC Metallurg Novokuznetsk)
 Valeri Matyunin (FC Kuzbass Kemerovo)
 Aleksandr Muzyka (FC Dynamo Yakutsk)
 Oleg Nikulin (FC Chkalovets Novosibirsk)
 Yevgeni Sadovnikov (FC Metallurg Krasnoyarsk)
 Nikolai Tarakanov (FC Sakhalin Kholmsk)

Promotion tournament

See also
Russian Top League 1993
Russian Second League 1993

References
 Russian First League 1993 on KLISF

2
Russian First League seasons
Russia
Russia